The following list gives all islands and cities (villages and hamlets) in Tonga in alphabetical order with many local areas and nicknames as well. Coordinates are given for the centre of each place. All place names are given in the Tongan language.

Haʻapai group

Lifuka group
Fatumanongi 
Foa 
Faleloa, Houmale'ia 
Fangaleʻounga 
Fotua 
Lotofoa 
Nukunamo 
Fotuhaʻa 
Fotuhaʻa township 
Hakauata 
Haʻano, (Loto haʻa Ngana (central Ngana tribe)) 
Fakakakai 
Haʻano town 
Muitoa 
Pukotala 
Kao 
'Apikakai 
Topuefio 
Lifuka, Foʻi ʻoneʻone (sand crumb) 
Haʻatoʻu 
Holopeka 
Koulo 
Pangai, district's capital; nickname: Fanga ʻi he sī (harbour at sea) 
Tongoleleka, Vai ko Paluki (Paluki's water) 
Limu 
Lofanga 
Lofanga township 
Luahoko 
Luangahu 
Meama 
Moʻungaʻone 
Moʻungaʻone township 
Niniva 
Nukupule 
Ofolanga 
Tofua 
Hokula 
Hota'ane 
Manaka 
Uoleva 
Uonukuhahake 
Tofanga 
Uonukuhihifo 
ʻUiha 
Felemea; nickname: 'Otu Kinekina (Weary Islands) 
ʻUiha township 
Tatafa

Lulunga (archipelago)
Fakahiku 
Fetoa 
Fonuaika 
Foua 
Haʻafeva 
Ha'afeva township; nickname: Kolo ngatata (noisy town) 
Fonuamaka 
Kolo (Ha'apai) 
Leteoʻo 
Onoiki 
Kito 
Kotu 
Kotu township 
Lekeleka 
Luanamo 
Matuku 
Matuku township 
Nukulei 
Pepea 
Putuputua 
Teaupa 
Tokulu 
Tungua ; nickname: Sani Tungua (glorious Tungua)
Tungua township; nickname: Tainamu ʻa Paea (orphan's mosquito net) 
ʻOʻua 
ʻOʻua township

ʻOtu Muʻomuʻa group
Fetokopunga 
Fonoifua 
Fonoifua township 
Meama (Mu'omu'a) 
Tanoa 
Hunga Haʻapai 
Hunga Tonga 
Kelefesia 
Lalona 
Mango 
Mango township 
Mangoiki 
Nomuka 
Nomuka township 
Loto 
Puho'ava 
Tefisi 
Nomuka iki 
Muifuiva 
Nuku 
Nukufaiau 
Nukutula 
Tau 
Tele-ki-Vavaʻu 
Tele-ki-Tonga 
Tonumeia

Niua group
Niuafoʻou; nickname: Kaho mo Vailahi (reed with big lake) 
Angahā, island capital 
Fataʻulua 
Futu (abandoned) 
Kolofoʻou 
Aleleʻuta 
Mataʻaho 
Muʻa 
Petani 
Sapaʻata 
Tongamamaʻo 
ʻEsia 
Motu Lahi 
Motu Molemole 
Motu Siʻi 
Motu ʻAʻali 
Niuatoputapu 
Falehau  
Hihifo, island capital 
Vaipoa  
Hakautuʻutuʻu 
Hungana 
Nukuseilala 
Sikaihaʻa 
Tafuna 
Tavili 
Tuʻunga 
Tafahi 
Tafahi (village)

Tongatapu group
Minerva Reefs (also see Republic of Minerva) 
Tele-ki-Tokelau
Tele-ki-Tonga
Tongatapu (island) 
Vahe Hahake (eastern district)
Āfa 
Fātumu 
Fuaʻamotu, incorrectly: Fuʻamotu; nickname: Vai ko Latai (Latai's water) 
Hamula 
Haveluliku 
Haʻasini 
Hoi 
Holonga 
Kolonga; nickname: ʻUtu longoaʻa (noisy coast) 
Lāvengatonga 
Makaunga 
Malapo 
Manuka 
Muʻa, district capital; nickname: Paki mo e toʻi (picked with sap) 
Lapaha 
Tatakamotonga; nickname: Kolo kakala (fragrant town) 
Nakolo 
Navutoka 
Niutōua 
Nukuleka; nickname: Vai-kāsila (bilge water) 
Pelehake; nickname: Ī ʻo Lupea (fan of Lupea) 
Talafoʻou 
Talasiu 
ʻAlakifonua, short: ʻAlaki 
Vahe Hihifo (western district)
Fāhefa 
Fatai 
Matafonua 
Foʻui, (Lolo paongo (pandanus fruit scented oil)) 
Haʻakame; nickname: Hala toa mui (road of ironwood trees) 
Haʻakili 
Haʻalalo 
Haʻatafu 
Haʻutu 
Haʻavakatolo; nicknames: Vai ko hiva (singing water), Pua ko fanongo talanoa (flower listening to the story) 
Houma; nickname: Mapu ʻa Vaea (whistle (blowholes) of Vaea) 
Kalaʻau 
Kanokupolu; nicknames: Folaʻosi (a typical dancedress), Niu tuʻu tolu (3 standing palmtrees) 
Kolovai; nicknames: Taunga peka (flying foxes), Fala O Setane (Satan Mat) 
Lakepa 
Lomaiviti 
Masilamea; nickname: Vai ko lele ʻa lulu (running owl's water) 
Matahau 
Matangiake 
Haʻafeva 
Neiafu 
Nukunuku 
Teʻekiu 
Vaotuʻu 
ʻAhau; nickname: Ahi ʻo Ulakai (Ulakai's sandalwood tree) 
ʻUtulau; nickname: Alafolau Heavula  
Vahe Loto (central district)
Folaha 
Haveluloto, short: Havelu; nicknames: Piki pea vela (sticky then burn), Paini tuʻu ua (2 standing ironwood trees) 
Haʻateiho 
ʻĀtele 
Hōfoa; nickname: Fonu mo e moa (turtle and chicken) 
Longoteme 
Nukuhetulu 
Nukuʻalofa, national capital 
Fanga ʻo Pilolevu
Fasi mo e afi
Fongoloa
Hala ʻo Vave
Halaano
Halafoʻou
Halaleva
Houmakelikao
Hunga
Kape
Kolofoʻou
Kolomotuʻa, original Nukuʻalofa proper
Sopu ʻo Tāufaʻāhau, short: Sopu
Sia ko Veiongo
Tongataʻeapa
Longolongo
Haʻavakaʻotua
Kapetā
Tavatuʻutolu
Tuʻakātakilangi, incorrectly: Tuʻatakilangi
Lopaukamea
Mailetaha
Mataika
Matutuana
Maui
Maʻufanga, obsolete: Maʻofanga
Ngeleʻia
Pahu
Pātangata
Pīkula
Takaunove
Telekava
Teufaiva
Tufuenga
Vaolōloa
ʻAmaile
ʻĀnana
ʻUmusī
Pea; nicknames: Vai ko puna (upwelling water), Niuvākai (palmtree watchtower 
Popua, short for: Vaʻepopua 
Puke; nickname: Vai ko ʻoa (basket water) 
Tofoa 
Koloua 
Tokomololo; nickname: Vai ko Tuʻilokomana (Tuʻilokomana's water) 
Vainī 
Nualei 
Veitongo 
Lotohaʻapai 
Fafā 
Fukave 
Kanatea 
Makahaʻa 
Malinoa 
Manima 
Mataʻaho 
Monūafe 
Motutapu 
Moʻunu <ref</ref>
Moʻungatapu 
Ngofonua 
Nuku 
Nukunukumotu 
Siesia 
Oneata 
Pangaimotu 
Poloʻa 
Talakite 
Tau 
Toketoke 
ʻAtā 
ʻAtatā 
ʻAtatā (village) 
Tufuka 
Velitoa Hahake 
Velitoa Hihifo 
ʻAlakipeau 
ʻEueiki 
Fāʻimata 
ʻOnevai 
ʻOnevao 
ʻAta 
ʻEua; nicknames: Fungafonua (landtop), Vai ko Kahana (Kahana's water) 
Angahā 
Haʻatuʻa 
Houma 
Kolomaile 
ʻEuafoʻou 
Fataʻulua 
Futu 
Mataʻaho 
Muʻa 
Pangai 
Petani 
Sapaʻata 
Tongamamaʻo 
ʻEsia 
Tufuvai, short: Tufu 
ʻOhonua, island capital; nickname: Taha kae afe (one worth a thousand; an ironwood tree) 
Taʻanga 
Kalau

Vavaʻu group
Aʻa 
Faioa 
Fangasito 
Fatumanga 
Fonuafoʻou 
Fonualei 
Fonualei 
Fonuaʻunga 
Fonuaʻoneʻone 
Fuaʻamotu 
Hakaufasi 
Hunga; nicknames: Fā-ko-Avahungalu (screwpine of A.), Vaonukonuka (nukonuka bushes) 
Hunga township 
Fofoa 
Foiata 
Foilifuka 
Kalau 
Luafatu 
Luamoko 
Kapa 
Falevai 
Kapa township 
Vakataumai 
ʻOtea 
Luakapa 
Nuku 
Katofanga 
Kenutu 
Lolo 
Lape 
Lape township 
Late 
Lekeleka 
Luahiapo 
Lualoli 
Luatafito 
Luaʻafuleheu 
Luaʻatofuaʻa 
Luaʻui 
Mafana 
Maninita 
Moʻunu 
Muʻomuʻa 
Nuapapu 
Nuapapu township 
Matamaka 
Alinonga 
Kitu 
Luaʻofa 
Ofu 
Ofu township 
Ovaka 
Ovaka township 
Ovalau 
Pangaimotu 
Pangaimotu township 
ʻUtulei 
Afo 
Fafine 
Lotuma 
Tapana 
Fānautapu 
Lautala 
Nukutahanga 
Tuʻanukulau 
Sisia 
Tahifehifa 
Taula 
Taunga 
Taunga township 
Ngau 
Taʻuta 
Tokū 
Totokafonua 
Totokamaka 
Tuʻungasika 
Vakaʻeitu 
Kulo 
Langitoʻo 
Tangatasito 
Vavaʻu, or Vavaʻu lahi, the main island; nickname: ʻUtukalongalu (wave shaker cliff), Haʻafuluhao (a name) 
Faleono 
Feletoa 
Fungamisi 
Haʻakio 
Haʻalufuli 
Holonga 
Houma 
Leimatuʻa 
Longomapu 
Makāve 
Mangia 
Mataika 
Neiafu, district's capital; nickname: Vai ko Lēlea (Lēlea's water) 
Falaleu
Fangatongo
Faʻokula
Hopokanga
Houmelei
Kameli
Masilamea
Matangiake
Neiafutahi
Sailoame
Saineai
Vaipua
ʻOtumapa
ʻUtulangivaka
Talau 
Taoa 
Taʻanea 
Tefisi 
Toula 
Tuʻanekivale 
Tuʻanuku; nickname: Tavakefaiʻana (a tropic bird) 
Utui 
Vaimalo 
Kiato 
Koloa 
Holeva 
Koloa township 
Kolotahi 
Koloʻuta 
Matuʻanua 
Motulekaleka 
Nuku 
Okoa 
Okoa township 
Pousini 
Tueʻia 
Tulie 
ʻEuaiki 
ʻEuakafa 
ʻOloʻua 
ʻOloʻua township 
ʻOto 
ʻUmuna 
ʻUtungake 
Ngaʻunoho (or: Talihau) 
ʻUtungake township 
Mala

See also
Administrative divisions of Tonga
Lists of volcanoes

References

Official survey maps ministry of lands, 1962 with amendments

Tonga, List of cities in
Tonga, List of islands in
Cities
Islands